6.45x48mm XPL Swiss (or 6.45x48 GP 80) is an experimental intermediate rifle cartridge.

Development
It was developed in conjunction with the SIG SG 550 rifle, as a potential successor to the 7.5×55mm Schmidt–Rubin cartridge.

Description
The rimless cartridge has a base diameter of 11.82 mm (similar to the 7.62×51mm NATO) and a case length of 47.72 mm. 

The bullet is an unusual 6.65 mm diameter (6.45mm refers to the bore diameter), fractionally smaller than the common 6.5 mm (bore diameter) bullet.  

Production
The cartridge was not adopted, the SIG SG-550 went into production with the 5.6×45mm GP 90 round.

References

Pistol and rifle cartridges
Experimental cartridges